General elections were held in Sikkim in January 1973. The Sikkim National Party emerged as the largest party, winning nine of the 18 elected seats.

Electoral system
The State Council was established in 1953 by the Chogyal. It originally had 18 members, of which 12 were elected and six (including the President) appointed by the Chogyal. Of the 12 elected members, six were for the Nepali community and six for the Lepcha and the Bhutia communities. For the 1958 elections the number of seats was increased to 20 by adding one seat for the Sangha and an additional appointed member. In 1966 a further four seats had been added; one each for the Nepali and Lepcha/Bhutia communities, together with one for the Tsong and a scheduled caste seat.

Candidates for election to the Council had to be at least 30 years old, whilst the voting age was set at 21.

Election schedule
The election schedule was announced by the Election Commission on 23 September 1972.

Campaign
Prior to the elections the Sikkim State Congress and the Sikkim Janata Party merged to form the Sikkim Janata Congress.

Results

Constituency-wise

Appointed members
In addition to the elected members, six members were appointed to the Sikkim State Council by the Chogyal on 5 March; Traten Sherba Gyaltsen, Madan Mohan Rasaily, Chhoutuk Tsering Pazo, Dhan Bahadur Chettri, Kali Prasad Rai and Atang Lepcha.

Aftermath
Following the election, the Sikkim National Congress and Sikkim Janata Congress claimed that vote rigging took place in the South Sikkim constituency. They demanded that officials involved were arrested, but these demands were not met, leading to protests. The unrest led to the signing of a tripartite agreement on 8 May between the Choygal, Sikkimese political parties and the government of India. The agreement provided for the establishment of a responsible government under the supervision of a Chief Executive nominated by the Indian government.

References

Elections in Sikkim
Sikkim
1970s in Sikkim
Election and referendum articles with incomplete results
January 1973 events in Asia